The Times is a British daily newspaper based in London, the original English-language newspaper titled Times.

The newspaper is also the origin of the font/typeface Times New Roman.

(The) Times may also refer to:

 Time, dimension in which events can be ordered

Newspapers 
 The Times of Ceylon
 The Times of India
 The Times Blog (TheTimesBlog.com), India
 The Times of Israel
 Times of Malta (founded 1935)
 The Times (South Africa)

In the United States 
 The Times (Chicago), defunct in 2005
 The Times (Little Falls), in upstate New York
 The Times of Northwest Indiana, based in Munster, Indiana
 The Times (Pawtucket), Rhode Island
 The Times (Philadelphia), defunct (1875–1902)
 The Times (Shreveport), Louisiana
 The Times (Trenton), New Jersey
 The Times, one of the predecessors of The Cincinnati Times-Star
 The Times (Brownsville), Oregon
 The Times, a newspaper in Tualatin and Tigard, Oregon, published by Pamplin Media Group
 San Mateo County Times

Colloquially "The Times"
Note: Newspapers that have the word Times as suffix are often informally referred to as The Times contextually: either within the scope of the newspaper's own articles or by others within their environment.

 Air Force Times
 Altus Times
 Angling Times
 Antrim Times
 Arab Times
 Army Times
 The Aspen Times
 The Baltic Times
 The Bay City Times
 The Beaver County Times
 Beaverton Valley Times
 The Brampton Times
 The Bryan Times
 Brisbane Times
 The Brunei Times (2006–2016)
 The Budapest Times
 Burlington County Times
 The Canberra Times
 Cape Times
 Cape Cod Times
 The Capital Times
 Carroll County Times
 The Catholic Times (disambiguation) (multiple publications)
 Chicago Times
 China Times
 Church Times
 Coleraine Times
 Colonial Times
 The Cullman Times
 East Bay Times
 The El Dorado Times
 El Paso Times
 The Epoch Times
 Fiji Times
 The Floyd County Times
 Fort Morgan Times
 Gainesville Times (disambiguation)
 The Gadsden Times
 The Gettysburg Times
 Gippsland Times
 Gloucester County Times
 Gulf Times
 The Gympie Times
 The Hartford Times
 Havana Times
 Hereford Times
 The Hill Times
 The Himalayan Times
 Hindustan Times
 The Huntsville Times
 Inish Times
 International Times (multiple publications)
 The Irish Times
 The Jordan Times
 Kansas City Times
 The Kenton Times
 Kenya Times
 Khaleej Times
 Kuwait Times
 Larne Times
 Leavenworth Times
 Liberty Times
 Los Angeles Times
 The Louisville Times
 The Malibu Times
 Manchester Times
 The Manila Times
 Marine Corps Times
 The Martha's Vineyard Times
 The Montevideo Times
 Morocco Times
 The Moscow Times
 Mountain Times
 Navajo Times
 Navbharat Times
 The Navhind Times
 Navy Times
 Nepali Times
 New Sabah Times
 New Straits Times
 The New York Times
 North County Times
 Northeast Times
 The Northern Times
 Northern District Times
 The Northern Territory Times
 The Oban Times
 The Oxford Times
 Portadown Times
 Quad-City Times
 The Queensland Times
 Richmond and Twickenham Times
 The Roanoke Times
 Saigon Times
 The St. Petersburg Times
 Sakaal Times
 The Santiago Times
 The Seattle Times
 The Shetland Times
 South Eastern Times
 South Jersey Times
 The Southland Times
 Times of Suriname
 The Straits Times
 The Tacoma Times
 Taipei Times
 Tamil Times
 Tehran Times
 Thomasville Times
 Tirana Times
 The Tolucan Times
 Tyrone Times
 Victor Harbor Times, South Australia
 Vientiane Times
 Waikato Times
 The Washington Times
 Wiltshire Times
 Windy City Times
 Yemen Times
 The Chenab Times

Music

Groups 
 The Times (band), a British 1980s–90s independent band
 The Times showband, Irish showband 1968–82

Albums 
 The Times, an album by Ian Pooley released in 1996
The Times (EP), a 2020 Neil Young release

Other 
 Multiplication, or times, in mathematics
 Multiplication sign, ×, a glyph read as "times"
 The Times Group, a media-services conglomerate in India
 Times Publishing Company, a Florida newspaper and magazine publisher
 Times New Roman, or Times, a serif typeface originally commissioned by The Times
 Times (TV series), a 2021 South Korean television series
 The Times (TV program), an Australian current-affairs program
 The Times, a 1762 engraving by William Hogarth
 Tournament in Management and Engineering Skills, a competition created by the European Students of Industrial Engineering and Management

See also 

 The Sunday Times (disambiguation)
 The Tymes, an American soul vocal group
 Time (disambiguation)